Half Tee Half Beast is the fourth commercial mixtape by American rapper Tee Grizzley. It was released on April 15, 2022, by Grizzley Gang and 300 Entertainment. The mixtape features guest appearances from Lakeyah and Baby Grizzley. The mixtape was mainly produced by J. R. Rotem, alongside other producers including Chopsquad DJ, D.A. Got That Dope, and Helluva, among others. The mixtape was supported by three singles: "Afterlife", "Beat The Streets" and "Buss It All Down". The mixtape received mixed critical reviews and charted at number 116 on the US Billboard 200 chart, dated April 30, 2022.

Background and promotion 
Tee Grizzley described the meaning of the mixtape title by stating:

Singles 
The mixtape's first single, "Afterlife", was released on January 28, 2022, along with an accompanying music video.

The mixtape's second single, "Beat The Streets", was released on March 3, 2022. The music for the song was premiered on March 4, after the single was released.

The mixtape's third and final single, "Buss It All Down", was released on March 31, 2022. The music video for the song was premiered on April 1, after the single was released.

Critical reception 

Half Tee Half Beast was met with generally mixed reviews from music critics. Paul Simpson of AllMusic, gave the mixtape 3 out of 5 stars, stating that the project "reflects his humanity as well as the struggles he's endured throughout his life, which have only made him stronger." Next, he says the "hard-as-nails bangers like the piercing "Loyalty" and "Hustlin" leave the biggest impression, but lighter, more introspective cuts like the eerie "Oh Yeah" and the empowering "Your Grave" demonstrate his sensitive side".

On BensBeat, the critic says "While his style can get a little stagnant after a while and there are a couple moments where it's clear Grizzley doesn't understand where his greatest strengths lie, it's hard not to nod your head to most of his flow. Not to mention – there's a blast from the past in J. R. Rotem doing most of the beats on this project". The critic gave the mixtape a 6 out of 10.

Track listing 
Credits adapted from Tidal and Genius.

Sample credits 

 "Built 4 It" contains samples from "Changes" written by Tupac Shakur, Deon Evans and Bruce Hornsby, performed by 2Pac featuring Talent.

Personnel 
Credits were adapted from Tidal.

Vocalists 

 Tee Grizzley – primary artist
 Lakeyah – featured artist (track 2)
 Baby Grizzley – featured artist (track 17)

Production 

 J. R. Rotem – executive producer (tracks 1-7, 9, 12, 15-16)
 Chopsquad DJ – producer (track 1)
 Black Man Chant – producer (track 7)
 D.A. Got That Dope – producer (tracks 8, 10, 13)
 Helluva – producer (track 11)
 Stefanccino – producer (track 11)
 Antt Beatz – producer (track 14)
 Marlin Brandoe – producer (track 17)

Technical 

 Selim Bouab – A&R direction (all tracks)
 Colin Leonard – masterer (all tracks)
 J. R. Rotem – mixer (track 1-5, 7, 9)
 Jaycen Joshua – mixer (track 6)
 Patrizio "Teezio" Pigliapoco – mixer (tracks 8, 10, 11, 13, 15-17)
 Antt Beats – mixer (track 14)
 Ignacio Portales – assistant mixing engineer (track 15)

Charts

References 

2022 mixtape albums
Tee Grizzley albums
Albums produced by D. A. Doman
Albums produced by J. R. Rotem